Rory Susanna Guilday (born September 7, 2002) is an American ice hockey defenceman for Cornell and member of the United States women's national ice hockey team. She represented the United States at the 2022 IIHF Women's World Championship.

Playing career
Guilday attended Minnetonka High School in Minnetonka, Minnesota, where she was a two-time captain, and twice earning all-state, all-conference and all-Metro team honors. As a senior in 2021, she recorded eight goals and 11 assists in 23 games. She was subsequently named a top-five finalist for the Minnesota Ms. Hockey Award, and was awarded the Class AA Herb Brooks Award.

Guilday began her collegiate career for Cornell during the 2021–22 NCAA season, where she recorded seven goals and 11 assists in 28 games. She made her debut on October 22, 2021, in a game against Mercyhurst and recorded her first collegiate point, an assist in the third period. She scored her first collegiate goal the next day in a 4–0 victory over Mercyhurst. She was subsequently named the ECAC Hockey Rookie of the Week for the week ending October 25, 2021, after she recorded two points and eight blocked shots during the weekend series. She ranked second on the team in blocked shots with 63, and ranked fourth on the team in points. Following the season, she was named to the All-Ivy League second team, ECAC Hockey All-Rookie team, and the USCHO All-Rookie team. She became the first Cornell player to earn a national all-rookie honor since Micah Zandee-Hart in 2016.

International play
Guilday represented the United States at the 2020 IIHF World Women's U18 Championship where she recorded one goal in five games and won a gold medal. On August 14, 2022, she was named to the roster for the United States at the 2022 IIHF Women's World Championship.

Personal life
Guilday was diagnosed with a brain tumor in 2016 that led to optic nerve glioma and she was sidelined from any contact sports for a year due to chemotherapy. As a result, she lost the majority of eyesight in her right eye.

Career statistics

Regular season and playoffs

International

References

External links

2002 births
Living people
American women's ice hockey defensemen
Cornell Big Red women's ice hockey players
Ice hockey people from Minnesota
People from Chanhassen, Minnesota